Bloomfield is a home rule–class city in Nelson County, Kentucky, in the United States. The population was 838 during the 2010 U.S. census. Former names of the city included Middlesburg and Gandertown.

History
The community on the east fork of Simpson Creek originally grew up on sites purchased from Leven Powell's  land grant, which he received from the state of Virginia in 1779 and surveyed in 1781. The community on the east bank of the creek was known as Middlesburg when its first post office opened in 1803; the west bank was known as Gandertown from its sport of "ganderpulling". Dr. John Bemiss of Rochester, New York, had settled in the area in 1799; in 1817, he laid out the town and renamed it Bloomfield, supposedly after his wife's maiden name (Bloomer) and his daughter's married name (Merrifield). The post office adopted this name the next year, but, according to the state's Land Office, the town was still formally incorporated under the name Middlesburg in 1819.

Bloomfield's economy has always been agriculturally based, but there was a flour mill and a tobacco auction house in the 19th century. The Newell B. McClaskey House and plantation was built in 1835, and is now listed on the National Register of Historic Places. The McClaskey family had owned over 700 acres of land in the area at one time.

The public library was established in 1916 by the local Woman's Club.

Geography
Bloomfield is located at  (37.914332, -85.319232) on the East Fork of Simpson Creek (part of the Salt River watershed).

Demographics

As of the census of 2010, there were 838 people, 334 households, and 230 families residing in the city. The racial makeup of the city was 89.3% White (88.1% non-Hispanic), 8.6% African American, 0.48% Asian, 0.72% from other races, and 0.95% from two or more races. Hispanics or Latinos of any race were 2.0% of the population. No one in the city identified exclusively as a Native American or Pacific Islander.

There were 334 households, out of which 35.3% had children under the age of 18 living with them, 48.8% were married couples living together, 14.4% had a female householder with no husband present, 5.7% had a male householder with no wife present, and 31.1% were non-families. 28.1% of all households were made up of individuals, and 12.3% had someone living alone who was 65 years of age or older. The average household size was 2.51 and the average family size was 3.04.

The age distribution was 27.2% under 18, 6.8% from 18 to 24, 22.8% from 25 to 44, 26.6% from 45 to 64, and 16.6% who were 65 or older. The median age was 38.5 years. For every 100 females, there were 97.6 males. For every 100 females age 18 and over, there were 84.8 males.

The median income for a household in the city was $50,938, and the median income for a family was $51,528. Full-time male workers had a median income of $46,944 versus $26,510 for females. The per capita income for the city was $20,279. About 18.1% of families and 18.9% of the population were below the poverty line, including 34.7% of those under age 18 and 10.2% of those age 65 or over.

Education
There are two public schools, Bloomfield Elementary School and Bloomfield Middle School; there are two schools now closed: the former Bloomfield High School and Eli H Brown Elementary school, both now privately owned. Eli Brown was a black-only school during segregation.

Bloomfield has a lending library, a branch of the Nelson County Public Library.

Notable residents

Jereboam Beauchamp and wife Anna, buried in the same coffin at their request. In 1825, Beauchamp murdered Col. Solomon Sharp in Frankfort after his (alleged) seduction of Anna. When he was remanded to the Frankfort jail, Anna refused to be separated from him even by force. On the day he were sentenced to hang, they attempted suicide by stabbing: Anna died from her wound but Beauchamp lived to be hanged, Kentucky's first legal lynching. The pair's devotion inspired popular treatment of their story, including Politian by Edgar Allan Poe.
 Jerry Bruckheimer, film and television producer, maintains a second home nearby; his wife, Linda Bruckheimer, owns several historic buildings downtown
James Guthrie, state representative, Secretary of the Treasury, senator, & president of the L&N Railroad
 Stith Thompson, American folklore scholar

See also 

 National Register of Historic Places listings in Nelson County, Kentucky

References

External links

Bloomfield Historic District - National Register of Historic Places inventory form

Cities in Kentucky
Cities in Nelson County, Kentucky
Louisville metropolitan area
Populated places established in 1819
1819 establishments in Kentucky